Xylophanes hannemanni is a moth of the  family Sphingidae. It is known from Mexico, Guatemala, Nicaragua, Costa Rica and Panama and further south through Ecuador to Peru and Bolivia.

The wingspan is 68–83 mm. It is similar to Xylophanes germen, but the outer margin of the forewing is smooth (except for some specimens from Peru and Bolivia, in which the outer margin may be slightly crenulate) and somewhat concave.

There are probably at least three generations per year. Adults have been recorded year round in Costa Rica.

The larvae possibly feed on Psychotria panamensis, Psychotria correae, Psychotria horizontalis, Psychotria eurycarpa, Psychotria elata and Psychotria nervosa, Palicourea padifolia, Coussarea austin-smithii and Thalia geniculata. The larvae have eyespots, but these are barely noticeable in the second instar and usually do not become evident until the third or fourth instar. They have a very broad tail.

Subspecies
Xylophanes hannemanni hannemanni
Xylophanes hannemanni pacifica Cadiou & Haxaire, 1997 (Pacific region of Mexico)

References

hannemanni
Moths described in 1917